Five ships of the Royal Navy have been named HMS Ramillies after the Battle of Ramillies (23 May 1706):

She was renamed HMS Ramillies in 1706, and was rebuilt between 1733 and 1741, before finally being wrecked in 1760.
  was a 74-gun third rate launched in 1763. She was damaged in a storm in 1782 and was subsequently burnt.
  was a 74-gun third rate launched in 1785. She was placed on harbour service in 1831 and was broken up in 1850.
  was a  launched in 1892 and scrapped in 1913.
  was a  launched in 1916. She was placed on harbour service from 1945 and was scrapped in 1948.
 HMS Ramillies was to have been a  ordered in 1964, but cancelled in 1965.

Battle honours
Ships named Ramillies have earned the following battle honours:
Glorious First of June, 1794
Copenhagen, 1801
Spartivento, 1940
Mediterranean, 1940
Atlantic, 1941
Diego Suarez, 1942
Normandy, 1944
South France, 1944

Royal Navy ship names